Luis Donaldo Colosio Riojas (born 31 July 1985) is a Mexican lawyer and politician. He is the mayor of the city of Monterrey and was a legislator in the Congress of Nuevo León from 1 September 2018 to 1 February 2021. He is the son of Luis Donaldo Colosio Murrieta, the PRI presidential candidate, who was assassinated at a campaign rally in Tijuana during the Mexican presidential campaign of 1994.

Biography
Born in Magdalena de Kino on 31 July 1985, Luis Donaldo Colosio Riojas has a younger sister named Mariana Colosio Riojas.

In 1994 after his father's assassination in March and his mother's death in November when he was 9 years old and his sister 1 year old. Colosio Riojas and his sister were adopted by their maternal aunt and uncle Hilda Elisa Riojas and Fernando Cantú.

He studied law in the Monterrey Institute of Technology and Higher Education and graduated in 2010. He received a postgraduate diploma in Financing and Methods of International Payments, also by ITESM, in 2016. He currently studies a Master's of Legal Studies in Corporate Law in the Universidad de Monterrey.

Political career
Colosio Riojas became the candidate for the IV District of Nuevo León under political party Movimiento Ciudadano in the 2018 statewide elections in which he won with 33.41% of the votes. On 1 September 2018, he assumed office as a member of the LXXV Legislature in the Congress of Nuevo León.

In January 2021, Colosio Riojas registered as a pre-candidate for mayor of Monterrey, Nuevo León for the 2021 elections under political party Movimiento Ciudadano.  He won the election in June with over 47% of the vote in an 8-way race, defeating his nearest opponent by more than 16%.

References

Further reading
Castañeda, Jorge G. Perpetuating Power: How Mexican Presidents Were Chosen. New York: The New Press 2000. 
Krauze, Enrique, Mexico: Biography of Power. New York: HarperCollins 1997.

External links
Official web site
Official Facebook page

Living people
1985 births
Citizens' Movement (Mexico) politicians
Members of the Congress of Nuevo León
Municipal presidents of Monterrey
Monterrey Institute of Technology and Higher Education alumni
Politicians from Sonora
21st-century Mexican politicians